José S. Alegría (July 17, 1886 – July 29, 1965), was a poet, writer, lawyer and politician. Alegría was a founding member of the Puerto Rican Nationalist Party and president of the political organization from 1928 to 1930.

Early years
Alegría was born in the town of Dorado, Puerto Rico where he received his primary and secondary education. In 1901, he earned a teachers certificate. Alegría became interested in politics at a young age and when he was 16 years old, he founded the Federal Youth Committee of the Federal Party in the town of Barceloneta. His family sent him to the United States to continue his college education. He attended Valparaiso University, in Indiana and in 1908 earned his law degree.

Political career
When he returned to Puerto Rico, he joined the Union Party of Puerto Rico. The Union Party was founded in February 1904 by Luis Muñoz Rivera, Rosendo Matienzo Cintrón, Antonio R. Barceló, José de Diego and others after the disbanding of the Federal Party. The party supported greater self-government for the island, though the party was divided between those in favor of independence and those favoring statehood. The party was highly successful electorally through the 1930s.

Alegría was named municipal judge of the town of Salinas. He also served as the municipal judge of the towns of Santa Isabel and Manatí in different occasions.

In 1919, José Coll y Cuchí, a member of the Union Party, felt that the party was not doing enough for the cause of Puerto Rican independence and with his followers founded the Nationalist Association of Puerto Rico in San Juan. By the 1920s there were two other pro-independence organizations in the Island: the Nationalist Youth and the Independence Association of Puerto Rico. The Independence Association was founded by Alegría, Eugenio Font Suárez and Dr. Leopoldo Figueroa in 1920.

On September 17, 1922, these three political organizations joined forces and formed the Puerto Rican Nationalist Party and Coll y Cuchi was elected president. Alegría followed Coll y Cuchi and was elected vice-president. In 1924, Dr. Pedro Albizu Campos joined the party and was also named vice-president. By 1930, disagreements between Coll y Cuchi and Albizu Campos as to how the party should be run, led the former and his followers to abandon the party and return to the Union Party. Alegría was named party president in 1928 and held that position until 1930. On May 11, 1930, Dr. Pedro Albizu Campos was elected president of the Puerto Rican Nationalist Party.

In 1932, Alegría joined the Liberal Party of Puerto Rico, a pro-independence political party. In 1936, he was elected to the House of Representatives in the Puerto Rican legislature and served in that position until 1940.

Arts
During the 1930s, Alegría presided over the "Casino de Puerto Rico". As such he became interested in the visual arts. He learned some painting techniques from Puerto Rican artist Francisco Oller and from Fernando Díaz Mckenna. From 1938 to 1949, he was the director of the magazine "Puerto Rico Illustrado", there he published some of his poems under the name of Raimundo Lucio.

Among his written works are the following:

 "Antología de poetas jóvenes de Puerto Rico" (Anthology of young poets of Puerto Rico) (1918)
"Crónicas frívolas" (Frivolous Chronics) (1938)
"Retablos de la aldea" (Altarpieces of the village) (1949)
"El alma de la aldea" (The soul of a village)  (1956)
"Cartas a Florinda" (Letters to Florinda) (1958)
"Rosas y flechas" (Roses and arrows) (1958)

Later years
Alegría was the President of the Puerto Rican Institute of Hispanic Culture. He was bestowed with the Order of Isabel the Catholic in recognition of his contributions to the institute. He is the father of Ricardo Alegría (1921 – 2011) a scholar, cultural anthropologist and archeologist known as the "Father of Modern Puerto Rican Archaeology".

Alegría died in his home in San Juan and is buried at Santa María Magdalena de Pazzis Cemetery, located just outside the city walls of Old San Juan. The city of Dorado honored his memory by naming a high school, Jose S. Alegria High School, after him.

See also

List of Puerto Ricans
Puerto Rican Nationalist Party
History of Puerto Rico

References

1886 births
1965 deaths
Burials at Santa María Magdalena de Pazzis Cemetery
People from Dorado, Puerto Rico
Puerto Rican Nationalist Party politicians
Puerto Rican poets
Puerto Rican male writers
Members of the Puerto Rican Nationalist Party
Puerto Rican independence activists
Puerto Rican nationalists
Valparaiso University alumni
20th-century American poets
20th-century American male writers